Firuz Kanatlı (1932 – 18 October 2017) was a Turkish businessman and founder and honorary president of the well known company Eti.

He was born in Eskişehir, Turkey in 1932. He attended primary school until the third school year, after which he went to Galatasaray High School in Istanbul and graduated from there. He studied business administration at the University of Geneva in Switzerland. When he returned home, he started to work in his father's flour mill, the "Gümülcineli Flour Mill". The factory would later be renamed to "Kanatlı Flour Mill".

The dream of establishing his own business lead Kanatlı to search for a work branch. His grandparents' first millstone-flour mill "Gümülcine" (Turkish for Komotini, a city in  East Macedonia and Thrace of Greece) led him to reconnect with his family history, and led him to the idea to produce pasta. Because sugar was easy to find in the sugar refinery nearby, he decided to branch out into the cookie business.

In that time, there was only cookie brands "Arı", "Ülker", "Besler", "Haylayf" and "İdeal", whose factories where all in Istanbul, however, he changed that and brought cookie production to Central Anatolia. He wanted to bring his cookies onto the market under the nameBal (Honey) but someone else had already claimed the rights to that trade mark. Because of this, he created the brand "Eti" (Turkish for "Hittites") instead, and began producing under this name in 1962.

Personal life 
Firuz Kanatlıs wife Gülay Kanatlı died on 4 August 2015 at the age of 73.

Sources

References

1932 births
People from Eskişehir
Galatasaray High School alumni
University of Geneva alumni
Turkish businesspeople
2017 deaths